Columbia is the female national personification of the United States. It was also a historical name applied to the Americas and to the New World. The association has given rise to the names of many American places, objects, institutions and companies, including the District of Columbia; Columbia, South Carolina; Columbia University; "Hail, Columbia" and Columbia Rediviva; the Columbia River. Images of the Statue of Liberty (Liberty Enlightening the World, erected in 1886) largely displaced personified Columbia as the female symbol of the United States by around 1920, although Lady Liberty was seen as an aspect of Columbia. However, Columbia's most prominent display today is being part of the logo of the Hollywood film studio Columbia Pictures.

Columbia is a New Latin toponym, in use since the 1730s with reference to the Thirteen Colonies which formed the United States. It originated from the name of the Genoese explorer Christopher Columbus and from the Latin ending -ia, common in the Latin names of countries (paralleling Britannia, Gallia, Zealandia, and others).

History

Early

The earliest type of personification of the Americas, seen in European art from the 16th century onwards, reflected the tropical regions in South and Central America from which the earliest European travellers reported back.  Such images were most often used in sets of female personifications of the Four Continents. America was depicted as a woman who, like Africa, was only partly dressed, typically in bright feathers, which invariably formed her headdress.  She often held a parrot, was seated on a caiman or alligator, with a cornucopia.  Sometimes a severed head was a further attribute, or in prints scenes of cannibalism appeared in the background.

18th century
Though versions of this depiction, tending as time went on to soften the rather savage image into an "Indian princess" type, and in churches emphasizing conversion to Christianity, served European artists well enough, by the 18th century they were becoming rejected by settlers in North America, who wanted figures representing themselves rather than the Native Americans they were often in conflict with.

Massachusetts Chief Justice Samuel Sewall used the name Columbina (not Columbia) for the New World in 1697. The name Columbia for America first appeared in 1738 in the weekly publication of the debates of Parliament in Edward Cave's The Gentleman's Magazine. Publication of Parliamentary debates was technically illegal, so the debates were issued under the thin disguise of Reports of the Debates of the Senate of Lilliput and fictitious names were used for most individuals and placenames found in the record. Most of these were transparent anagrams or similar distortions of the real names and some few were taken directly from Jonathan Swift's Gulliver's Travels while a few others were classical or neoclassical in style. Such were Ierne for Ireland, Iberia for Spain, Noveborac for New York (from Eboracum, the Roman name for York) and Columbia for America—at the time used in the sense of "European colonies in the New World".
By the time of the Revolution, the name Columbia had lost the comic overtone of its Lilliputian origins and had become established as an alternative, or poetic name for America. While the name America is necessarily scanned with four syllables, according to 18th-century rules of English versification Columbia was normally scanned with three, which is often more metrically convenient. For instance, the name appears in a collection of complimentary poems written by Harvard graduates in 1761 on the occasion of the marriage and coronation of King George III.
Behold, Britannia! in thy favour'd Isle;
At distance, thou, Columbia! view thy Prince,
For ancestors renowned, for virtues more;

The name Columbia rapidly came to be applied to a variety of items reflecting American identity. A ship built in Massachusetts in 1773 received the name Columbia Rediviva and it later became famous as an exploring ship and lent its name to new Columbias.

After Independence

No serious consideration was given to using the name Columbia as an official name for the independent United States, but with independence, the name became popular and was given to many counties, townships, and towns as well as other institutions.
 In 1784, the former King's College in New York City had its name changed to Columbia College, which became the nucleus of the present-day Ivy League Columbia University.
 In 1786, South Carolina gave the name Columbia to its new capital city. Columbia is also the name of at least 19 other towns in the United States.
 In 1791, three commissioners appointed by President George Washington named the area destined for the seat of the United States government the Territory of Columbia. In 1801, it was organized as the District of Columbia.
 In 1792, the Columbia Rediviva sailing ship gave its name to the Columbia River in the American Northwest (much later, the Rediviva gave its name to the Space Shuttle Columbia).
 In 1798, Joseph Hopkinson wrote lyrics for Philip Phile's 1789 inaugural "President's March" under the new title of "Hail, Columbia". Once used as de facto national anthem of the United States, it is now used as the entrance march of the Vice President of the United States.
 In 1821, citizens of Boone County, Missouri, chose the name for their new city Columbia, Missouri,
 In 1865 Jules Verne's novel From the Earth to the Moon, the spacecraft to the Moon was fired from a giant Columbiad cannon.

In part, the more frequent usage of the name "Columbia" reflected a rising American neoclassicism, exemplified in the tendency to use Roman terms and symbols. The selection of the eagle as the national bird, the heraldric use of the eagle, the use of the term Senate to describe the upper house of Congress and the naming of Capitol Hill and the Capitol building were all conscious evocations of Roman precedents.

Columbian
The adjective Columbian has been used to mean "of or from the United States of America" such as in the 1893 World's Columbian Exposition held in Chicago, Illinois. It has occasionally been proposed as an alternative word for American.

Columbian should not be confused with the adjective pre-Columbian, which refers to a time period before the arrival of Christopher Columbus in 1492. Columbia should also not be confused with the modern-day Republic of Colombia.

Personification 

As a quasi-mythical figure, Columbia first appears in the poetry of the African-American Phillis Wheatley in 1776, during the Revolutionary War:

Especially in the 19th century, Columbia was visualized as a goddess-like female national personification of the United States and of liberty itself, comparable to the British Britannia, the Italian Italia Turrita and the French Marianne, often seen in political cartoons of the 19th and early 20th century. The personification was sometimes called Lady Columbia or Miss Columbia. Such an iconography usually personified America in the form of an Indian queen or Native American princess.

The image of the personified Columbia was never fixed, but she was most often presented as a woman between youth and middle age, wearing classically-draped garments decorated with stars and stripes. A popular version gave her a red-and-white-striped dress and a blue blouse, shawl, or sash, spangled with white stars. Her headdress varied and sometimes it included feathers reminiscent of a Native American headdress while other times it was a laurel wreath, but most often, it was a cap of liberty.

Early in World War I (1914–1918), the image of Columbia standing over a kneeling "Doughboy" was issued in lieu of the Purple Heart medal. She gave "to her son the accolade of the new chivalry of humanity" for injuries sustained in the World War.

In World War I, the name Liberty Bond for savings bonds was heavily publicized, often with images from the Statue of Liberty (Liberty Enlightening the World). The personification of Columbia fell out of use and was largely replaced by the Statue of Liberty as a feminine symbol of the United States.  

After Columbia Pictures adopted Columbia as its logo in 1924, she has since appeared as bearing a torch similar to that of the Statue of Liberty, unlike 19th-century depictions of Columbia. The Columbia Pictures logo is the most famous and prominent display of Columbia to many current Americans. 

Statues of the personified Columbia may be found among others in the following places:
 The 1863 Statue of Freedom atop the United States Capitol building, though not actually called Columbia, shares many of her iconic characteristics.
 Atop Philadelphia's Memorial Hall, built 1876
 The replica Statue of the Republic (Golden Lady) in Chicago's Jackson Park is often understood to be Columbia. It is one of the remaining icons of the 1893 World's Columbian Exposition.
 In the National Memorial Cemetery of the Pacific, dedicated 1949.
 In the Monument of Angola, Indiana.

Modern appearances 
Since 1800, the name Columbia has been used for a wide variety of items and places:
 The naming of the New World and of the newly independent country of Colombia after Christopher Columbus in the early 19th century is discussed at Colombia § Etymology.
 In the 1840s, British Columbia, which is now a province of Canada, was named by Queen Victoria. The details of the naming of the Columbia River and the Columbia provinces around it are discussed at British Columbia § Etymology.
 The element niobium was first called columbium, a name which some people still use today. The name columbium, coined by the chemist Charles Hatchett upon his discovery of the metal in 1801, reflected that the type specimen of the ore came from America.
 Avenues and streets in various cities and towns throughout the United States named Columbia Avenue or Columbia Street, such as the Columbia Avenue Historic District in Davenport, Iowa, and various Columbia Avenues in Pennsylvania cities.
 Columbia County, Wisconsin
 Columbia County, Pennsylvania
 Columbia, Kentucky in Adair County
 Columbia, Pennsylvania in Lancaster County
 Columbia, Maryland in Howard County
 Columbia, Connecticut in Tolland County
 The South Carolina state capital of Columbia, located in Richland County
 Columbia, Missouri in Boone County
 Columbia, Tennessee in Maury County
 Columbia Square, Savannah
 Columbia University, an Ivy League university in New York City that first adopted the name Columbia College in 1784 to replace King's College
 The song "Hail, Columbia," an American patriotic song. It was considered with several other songs one of the unofficial national anthems of the United States until 1931, when "The Star-Spangled Banner" was officially named the national anthem.
 The song "Columbia, Gem of the Ocean" (1843) commemorates the United States under the name Columbia.
 Columbia Records, founded in 1888, took its name from its headquarters in the District of Columbia.
 Columbia Pictures, named in 1924, uses a version of the personified Columbia as its logo after a great deal of experimentation.
 CBS's former legal name was the Columbia Broadcasting System, first used in 1928. The name derived from an investor, the Columbia Phonograph Manufacturing Company, which owned Columbia Records.
 The Command Module of the Apollo 11 spacecraft, the first crewed mission to land on the Moon, was named Columbia (1969).
 The Space Shuttle Columbia, built in 1975 to 1979, was named for the exploring ship Columbia.
 A personified Columbia appears in Uncle Sam, a graphic novel about American history (1997).
 The setting of the steampunk video game BioShock Infinite is the alternate reality city of Columbia, which makes frequent use of Columbia's image. Columbia herself is believed to be an archangel by the citizens.
 Columbia, played by Laura Bell Bundy, appears in season two of the Starz series American Gods, based on the 2001 novel of the same name by Neil Gaiman.
 The Columbia Typographical Union/CWA No. 101 is the oldest existing local union in the United States.

Gallery

See also 
 Bavaria, a symbol for the German state of Bavaria (Bayern)
 Britannia, a similar symbol for Britain
 Germania, a female personification of Germany
 Goddess of Democracy
 Italia turrita, a similar symbol for Italy
 Lady Justice
 Liberty, a goddess personification of Liberty
 Marianne, a similar symbol for France
 Our Lady of Guadalupe, a similar symbol for Mexico, albeit of religious nature
 Mother Russia, a medieval feminine personification of Russia

References

Sources 
 Higham, John (1990). "Indian Princess and Roman Goddess: The First Female Symbols of America", Proceedings of the American Antiquarian Society. 100: 50–51, JSTOR or PDF
 Le Corbeiller, Clare (1961), "Miss America and Her Sisters: Personifications of the Four Parts of the World", The Metropolitan Museum of Art Bulletin, vol. 19, pp. 210–223, PDF 
 George R. Stewart (1967). Names on the Land. Houghton Mifflin Company: Boston.

American culture
Fictional characters introduced in the 18th century
Liberty symbols
National personifications
National symbols of the United States